Samsung NX1 is a 28.2 MP Wireless SMART Mirrorless Digital Camera body, using the NX System lens mount. A variety of professional and consumer lenses were introduced along with the camera. It was announced by Samsung on September 15, 2014. It uses TIZEN OS as its main Operating System and has 4k video recording. The NX1 has a weather-resistant magnesium alloy body, 3" tilting Super AMOLED touchscreen display, 2.36M dot OLED EVF with 5ms lag, LCD info display on top of camera, built-in 802.11ac Wi-Fi and Bluetooth, USB 3.0 interface, Hybrid AF system with 205 phase-detect points covering 90% of the frame, and 15 fps burst shooting with continuous autofocus. It can output 4:2:2 8-bit 4K video over HDMI, has context-sensitive adaptive noise reduction, stripe pattern AF illuminator with 15m range and optional battery grip. It was the first commercially available camera featuring a back-illuminated APS-C sized sensor. While Samsung never formally announced the discontinuation of the NX system, major retailers showed the NX1 as being "out of stock" around April 2016.

References

External links 
 
DPReview's review of the Samsung NX1
Trusted Reviews' preview of the Samsung NX1

NX1
Live-preview digital cameras
Tizen-based devices